Mount Saint Mary's College may refer to:

 Mount St Mary's College, Sheffield, England, UK
 Mount Saint Mary's University, Los Angeles, formerly known as Mount St. Mary's College, Los Angeles, California, USA
 Mount Saint Mary's College Namagunga, Mukono District, Uganda

See also
 Mount Saint Mary College, Newburgh, New York, USA
 Mount Saint Mary's University, formerly known as Mount Saint Mary's College, Emmitsburg, Maryland, USA
 Mount St. Mary's (disambiguation)
 Saint Mary's College (disambiguation)